Better Off Out (BOO) is the name of a non-party campaign that called for the United Kingdom (UK)'s withdrawal from the European Union (EU). It is run by The Freedom Association, a pressure group that describes itself as non-partisan, centre-right and libertarian, and has links to the Conservative Party, The Brexit Party and UK Independence Party (UKIP). The campaign was formed in 2006 and is based in Cheltenham, England.

Supporters
The patrons of the campaign include Lord Tebbit, the former Chairman of the Conservative Party as well as author Frederick Forsyth CBE and Professor Tim Congdon CBE, an economist and former UKIP PPC.

Lord Weatherill, the former Speaker of the House of Commons, was also a patron of the campaign until to his death.

Members of Parliament
Prior to the 2016 United Kingdom European Union membership referendum, Better Off Out was supported by a number of Conservative Members of Parliament including Peter Bone, Christopher Chope, David T C Davies, Philip Davies, Gordon Henderson, Philip Hollobone, David Nuttall, Heather Wheeler, Andrew Percy, Laurence Robertson and Richard Shepherd. There are a number of Conservative former members of parliament who supported Better Off Out.

The former Labour MP for Great Grimsby, Austin Mitchell was also a supporter. There were a number of Democratic Unionist Party MPs and Members of the Northern Ireland Legislative Assembly, including their leader Peter Robinson and former leader Ian Paisley. Others include Gregory Campbell, Nigel Dodds, Jeffrey Donaldson, Dr. William McCrea, Ian Paisley, Jr., Jim Shannon, David Simpson and Sammy Wilson as well as prominent members of the smaller Traditional Unionist Voice, including William Ross and former MEP Jim Allister.

Former UKIP MP Douglas Carswell, and former MP Mark Reckless, are signatories.

Members of the European Parliament

The Conservative MEPs at the time of the referendum David Campbell-Bannerman, Roger Helmer (who has since left the Conservative party and joined UKIP) and Daniel Hannan had also signed.

Academics and artists
Other non-nolitical supporters include the academics Ruth Lea, Patrick Minford and Alan Walters.

Management Committee
 Committee chairman: John Kershaw 
 Hon. Secretary: Tony Hilder 
 Hon. Treasurer: Michael McGough FCA Sir Mark Worthington OBE (ex official), Christopher Gill, Euan Stewart, Mark Wallace
 Chief Executive: Simon Richards
 Director: Rory Broomfield
 Head of Campaigns: Andrew Allison
 ‘Better Off Out’ Campaigns Manager: Rupert Matthews

Conservative Party blacklisting
In March 2007 the Conservative Central Office warned its party membership that BOO was contrary to Conservative Party policy.

See also
Euroscepticism
Brexit
Russian interference in the 2016 Brexit referendum

References

Further reading

Gill, Christopher. 2006. Letter from the Chairman (PDF), July/August 2006, Freedom TODAY, published by the Freedom Association. Retrieved 2008-07-08

External links
 https://web.archive.org/web/20180324181958/http://www.betteroffout.net/

2006 establishments in the United Kingdom
2006 in British politics
Euroscepticism in the United Kingdom
Organisations based in Cheltenham
Organizations established in 2006
2006 establishments in England
2016 United Kingdom European Union membership referendum
Brexit–related advocacy groups in the United Kingdom